was a Japanese samurai of the Sengoku period, who was the younger brother of Takeda Shingen, the ruler of Kai Province. He is known as one of the "Twenty-Four Generals of Takeda Shingen".  Nobutatsu also served under Shingen's son, Takeda Katsuyori. He fought at Nagashino in 1575.

Family
Father: Takeda Nobutora (1494-1574)
Brothers:
 Takematsu (1517-1523)
Takeda Shingen (1521-1573)
 Inuchiyo (1523-1529)
Takeda Nobushige (1525-1561)
 Takeda Nobumoto
Takeda Nobukado (1529-1582)
 Matsuo Nobukore (ca. 1530s-1571)
 Takeda Souchi
Takeda Nobuzane (ca. 1530s-1575)
Sisters:
 Joukei-in (1519-1550), married Imagawa Yoshimoto
 Nanshou-in (born 1520) married Anayama Nobutomo
 Nene (1528-1543) married Suwa Yorishige

References

External links 
  "Legendary Takeda's 24 Generals" at Yamanashi-kankou.jp

 

Samurai
1539 births
1582 deaths
Takeda clan
Takeda retainers